Medical astrology (traditionally known as iatromathematics) is an ancient applied branch of astrology based mostly on melothesia (Gr. μελοθεσία), the association of various parts of the body, diseases, and drugs with the nature of the sun, moon, planets, and the twelve astrological signs. The underlying basis for medical astrology, astrology itself, is considered to be a pseudoscience as there is no scientific basis for its core beliefs.

Historical references 
Medical astrology was mentioned by Marcus Manilius (1st century AD) in his epic poem (8000 verses) Astronomica.

Publications
Ficino, Marsilio, Three Books on Life (1489) [De vita libri tre] translated by Carol V. Kaske and John R. Clark, Center for Medieval and Early Renaissance Studies, State University of New York at Binghamton and The Reaissance Society of America (1989.) 
Lilly, William, Christian Astrology (1647)
Culpepper, Nicholas, Astrological Judgement of Diseases from the Decumbiture of the Sick (1655) 
Saunders, Richard, The Astrological Judgment and Practice of Physick (1677) 
Cornell, H.L., M.D., The Encyclopaedia of Medical Astrology (1933), Astrology Classics [Abington, MD, 2010.]

See also
Planets in astrology
Medieval medicine of Western Europe
Astrological botany
Spiritual healing
Astrology and science

References

 

Astrology by type
Traditional medicine
History of ancient medicine
History of astrology
Pseudoscience